Francesco Gabriele (born 20 January 1977) is an Italian football manager.

References

1977 births
Living people
Italian football managers
FC Baden managers
AC Bellinzona managers
FC Lausanne-Sport managers
FC Wil managers
FC Wohlen managers
Italian expatriate football managers
Expatriate football managers in Switzerland
Italian expatriate sportspeople in Switzerland